The Eleventh Malaysia Plan (11MP) (Malay: Rancangan Malaysia ke-11) 2016–2020 is Malaysia's five-year development plan towards realising the goal of Vision 2020. The preparation of the 11th Malaysia Plan is based on the National Development Strategy of Malaysia (MyNDS) which focuses on the development of people-based economy and capital-based economy with the implementation of high impact projects. The 11th Malaysia Plan was tabled at House of Representatives by Prime Minister of Malaysia Datuk Seri Najib Tun Razak on 21 May 2015.

Cores 
11MP has six cores:
 Strengthening Inclusive Into the Right People
 Increasing People's Prosperity
 Enhancing Human Capital Development for Developed Countries
 Sustainability and Development Resilience Through Green Growth
 Strengthening Infrastructure to Support Economic Growth
 Engineered Economic Growth for Increasing Prosperity

Further reading 
 Main Paper of the 11th Malaysia Plan
 Ministry of Economic Affairs page about all papers relating to RMK11
 Malaysian Government Documents Archive for EPU including RMK11

References 

Five-year plans of Malaysia